6267 Rozhen, provisional designation , is a stony Florian asteroid from the inner regions of the asteroid belt, approximately 3 kilometers in diameter. In 1987, the asteroid was discovered by Eric Elst at Rozhen Observatory, Bulgaria, and was later named after the discovering observatory.

Discovery 

Rozhen was discovered on 20 September 1987, by Belgian astronomer Eric Elst at Rozhen Observatory near Smoljan, Bulgaria. For four days, between 27 and 31 January 2005, the body was briefly and erroneously renamed 6267 Smolyan. In November 1949, a precovery was taken at Palomar Observatory, extending the body's observation arc by 38 years prior to its official discovery observation at Rozhen.

Orbit and classification 

The S-type asteroid is a member of the Flora family, one of the largest groups of stony asteroids in the main-belt. It orbits the Sun in the inner main-belt at a distance of 2.0–2.4 AU once every 3 years and 2 months (1,161 days). Its orbit has an eccentricity of 0.09 and an inclination of 2° with respect to the ecliptic.

Physical characteristics

Lightcurves 

In January 2014, two rotational lightcurves of Rozhen were obtained from photometric observations at the Palomar Transient Factory in California, United States.

Diameter and albedo 

The Collaborative Asteroid Lightcurve Link assumes an albedo of 0.24, derived from 8 Flora, the asteroid family's largest member and namesake, and calculates a diameter of 3.0 kilometers with an absolute magnitude of 14.77.

Naming 

This minor planet was named for the discovering Rozhen Observatory, also known as the "Bulgarian National Astronomical Observatory", that has been established at Rozhen in 1981.

Rozhen is located near the city of Smoljan and in proximity to the border with Greece. At 1700 meters above sea leavel, the observatory benefits from favorable instrumental and observational conditions. An exhaustive survey for the discovery of minor planets was launched at Rozhen in 1986. The approved naming citation was published by the Minor Planet Center on 20 November 2002.

References

External links 
 6267 Rozhen (1987 SO9) was renamed 6267 Smolyan
 Asteroid Lightcurve Database (LCDB), query form (info )
 Dictionary of Minor Planet Names, Google books
 Asteroids and comets rotation curves, CdR – Observatoire de Genève, Raoul Behrend
 Discovery Circumstances: Numbered Minor Planets (5001)-(10000) – Minor Planet Center
 
 

006267
Discoveries by Eric Walter Elst
Named minor planets
19870920